Ron Carter (born 1937) is an American jazz double-bassist.

Ron or Ronald Carter may also refer to:

Ron Carter (basketball) (born 1956), American basketball player
Ron Carter (businessman) (born 1935), New Zealand businessman
Ron Carter (ice hockey) (born 1958), Canadian professional ice hockey right winger
Ronald Carter (sport shooter) (born 1938), British sport shooter
Ronald Carter (linguist) (1947–2018), British linguist
Ronald G. Carter, American author